SPX can refer to:

 S&P 500, a stock market index
 Sequenced Packet Exchange, a networking protocol
 IATA code of Sphinx International Airport, an airport in Giza, Egypt
 Small Press Expo, an alternative comics convention
 SpaceX (SpX), a rocket manufacturer
 Sports Performance eXtreme, a sports shoe and clothing brand
 SPX Corporation, a Fortune 500 electronics company
 St. Pius X, the 257th Pope of the Roman Catholic Church.
 St Pius X College, Sydney, Australia
 St. Pius X Seminary, Roxas City, Philippines
 Superphénix, a nuclear power plant
 Skulduggery Pleasant: Resurrection, the 10th book in the Skulduggery Pleasant series
 A file extension used for Speex-encoded audio files
 The National Rail code for St Pancras International railway station in Greater London
 The former IATA and FAA code for Houston Gulf Airport